Alexander Weimann (born 1965, in Munich) is a German conductor and harpsichordist.

Weimann studied in Munich and then was a teacher at the Münchner Musikhochschule 1990–1995. He is a regular conductor of Les Voix Baroques and the Arion Ensemble.

References

German male conductors (music)
1965 births
Academic staff of the University of Music and Performing Arts Munich
Living people
21st-century German conductors (music)
21st-century German male musicians